Richard Hill (21 August 1885 - 26 September 1959) was a coach builder and member of the Queensland Legislative Assembly.

Biography
Hill was born in Kelvin Grove, Queensland, to parents William John Hill and his wife Julia (née Lock). He was educated at Kelvin Grove State School and Kelly's Private College. Upon leaving school he worked in the family's coach building business.

Hill was married three times, firstly to Laura May McKee in 1917 (died 1942), then Williamina Euphemia Low in 1945 (died 1948), and lastly to Anita Amy Frost in 1950. He died in September 1959 and was cremated at the Mt Thompson Crematorium.

Public career
Hill was the CPNP member for Kelvin Grove from 1929 until 1932. He was a member of the Kelvin Grove School Committee and Progress Association and a member of the council of the RNA for over thirty years.

He was also the ringmaster at the Brisbane Show from  1945 until 1959 and a judge for the Brisbane and Ipswich Amateur Turf Club at Doomben, Albion Park and Bundamba.

References

Members of the Queensland Legislative Assembly
1885 births
1959 deaths
20th-century Australian politicians